Guru Dakshina is a 1987 Bengali film directed by Anjan Choudhury and produced by Bhabesh Kundu. The film stars Ranjit Mallick, Tapas Paul, Satabdi Roy, Kali Banerjee, and Shakuntala Barua in the lead roles. The film is about a poor village boy named Jayanta Bose who becomes a popular singer through his singing.

Plot
Jayanta Bose, a poor naive village boy, gets a low paying job at the rich but corrupt businessman, Mr. Roy's company to support him and his mother. One day, he sings at Mr. Roy's function displaying his singing skills, which makes him an overnight star. He's also in love with Mr. Roy's beautiful daughter Rupa who's very supportive of his singing along with her elder brother, his other boss and brotherly figure, Rajat. However, the apparently jealous Mr. Roy makes him lose his fame after blackmailing his desperate music teacher when he begs for money for his grandson's treatment, to make Jayanta stop singing, which also ruins Jayanta's image to the point that he even gets blamed for the sudden death of the music teacher when the latter's widowed daughter-in-law confronts Jayanta for refusing to sing for her mom and sisters. Jayanta is very heartbroken by all of this and deeply misses singing but refuses to mention the reason he stopped singing after he promised his regretful music teacher. Meanwhile, Shekhar, the fiancé of Rupa, gets jealous of Jayanta and tries to frame him as a thief. But Rajat foils Shekhar's plan in front of everyone. Mr. Roy finally realises Shekhar has a cheap mentality. Mr. Roy later regretfully confesses on Rupa's birthday about the blackmail which lets Jayanta finally sing again which thrills everyone including his music teacher's daughter-in-law and grandson. Mr. Roy then gives his hand in marriage to Rupa as expected.

Cast
 Ranjit Mallick as Rajat Roy
 Tapas Paul as Jayanta Bose
 Satabdi Roy as Rupa Roy
 Kali Banerjee as Jayanta's music teacher
 Shakuntala Barua as Jayanta's music teacher's widowed daughter-in-law
 Bhabesh Kundu as Mr. Roy
 Soumitra Bannerjee as Shekhar
 Nimu Bhowmik
 Ishani Bannerjee

Music
The music of this film has been composed by Bappi Lahiri. Notable singers who lent their voice in this album include Kishore Kumar, Asha Bhosle, Mohammed Aziz, Bappi Lahiri, Bhupinder Singh, Chandrani Mukherjee and Abhijeet Bhattacharya. Most of the songs were popular, but the most notable one is "E Amar Gurudakshina ". "Aaji E Probhate" is one of Abhijeet Bhattacharya's earliest songs.

References

External links
 

Bengali-language Indian films
1987 films
1980s Bengali-language films
Films directed by Anjan Choudhury